Elize Cawood (28 June 1952 – 18 July 2020) was a South African actress. Her most famous TV role is probably that of Pop in Verspeelde lente (1984) and on the silver screen opposite Marius Weyers and Peter Sepuma as the rich Afrikaner woman in Taxi to Soweto. She has also been seen in movies such as Die wonderwerker (2012) and Lien se lankstaanskoene (2012).

Life and career

Elize Cawood was born in 1952 and matriculated at Hoërskool Sentraal in Bloemfontein. She then studied drama at the University of the Free State, where she obtained her B.A. degree. She began her career in 1974 with the then Sukovs. She starred in Paul Ziller's The Effect of Gamma Rays (directed by Ernst Eloff) and Bertolt Brecht's The Good Man of Setzuan (directed by William Egan). She has also performed in school and library programs.

Later she worked at Truk and then became a freelance actress. On stage, she became best known as Olive Schreiner in Stephen Gray's Schreiner - A One Woman Play (directed by Lucille Gillwald), as Elsa in the debut production of Athol Fugard's Road to Mecca in the Market Theater in Johannesburg, and as Stella in Tennessee Williams' The Tram's Name: Desire (translated by Lucas Malan and directed by Bobby Heany).

Personal life
Cawood married actor Wilson Dunster in 1982, with whom she appeared in Paul Slabolepszy's The Art Of Charf and Dinner For One. Her brother Bromley is a film and television director, and her daughter, Jenna Dunster, is also an actress.

Elize Cawood Dunster died on 18 July 2020 at the age of 68. The cause of her death was lung cancer, which was diagnosed in September 2019.

Filmography
 1979: Wat Jy Saai 
 1980: Les visiteurs 
 1981: Oh George! 
 1983: Verspeelde Lente 
 1983: Koöperasiestories 
 1986: Arme moordenaar 
 1987: Wolwedans in die Skemer
 1990: The Fourth Reich 
 1991: Taxi to Soweto
 1993: Daisy de Melker 
 1999: An Old Wife's Tale 
 2001: Der lange Weg  zum Sieg (The Long Run) 
 2001: Lyklollery (Kinofilm; Südafrika)
 2004: Red Dust
 2004: Der weiße Afrikaner 
 2007: Villa Rosa
 2007: Andries Plak
 2009: Isidingo
 2010: Proesstraat
 2010: Die Uwe Pottie Potgieter
 2010: Liefling die Movie
 2012: Die Wonderwerker
 2013: Lien se Lankstaanskoene
 2014: Pandjieswinkelstories (Pawnshop Stories)
 2015: Dis ek, Anna
 2016: Vir Altyd
 2016: Sy klink soos lente
 2016: Vir die Voëls
 2018: Stroomop

References

External links

1952 births
2020 deaths
Deaths from lung cancer in South Africa
Place of death missing
People from Bloemfontein
South African film actresses
South African stage actresses
South African television actresses
20th-century South African actresses
21st-century South African actresses
White South African people